The Bikerni Association of Women Motorcyclists (The Bikerni for short) is an all-women motorcycle club in India. It was formed at Pune in 2011 by Urvashi Patole and Firdaus Shaikh, and had over 515 members by 2014. , the group has over 2,000 members. It was recognized by Women's International Motorcycle Association as the first all-women motorcycle association in India. and is largely recognised as the first and largest all women motorcyclists association in India even today.

References

Further reading

External links

Motorcycle clubs
2011 establishments in Maharashtra
Motorcycling in India
Organisations based in Pune

Women's organisations based in India
Women motorcyclists